Rubin Teitelbaum (17 January 1907 – 4 September 1941) was an Estonian-Jewish weightlifter.

He was born in Tapa. His younger sister was track and field athlete, basketball and volleyball player Sara Teitelbaum.

He started his weightlifting exercising in 1925 at the gymnastics association "Sport". He was 7-times Estonian champion. He was a member of Estonian national weightlifting team.

He was killed in Tallinn in 1941 following the German occupation of Estonia during World War II during the Holocaust in Estonia.

References

1907 births
1941 deaths
People from Tapa, Estonia
People from Kreis Jerwen
Estonian Jews
Estonian male weightlifters
Estonian people who died in the Holocaust